Gradišče is a small settlement west of Polica in the Municipality of Grosuplje in central Slovenia. The area is part of the historical region of Lower Carniola, with its community being tied to its large neighboring village Polica. The municipality is included in the Central Slovenia Statistical Region. 

Archaeological evidence shows it was the location of an Iron Age hill fort. The fort was later torn down, with its stones being used to build the Polica church. There's a 19th century stone signpost present still. In 2022, there's been a big water reservoir built at the village's entrance, to prevent flooding in the nearby town of Grosuplje.

References

External links

Gradišče on Geopedia

Populated places in the Municipality of Grosuplje